Nikolay Petkov Bukhalov (born 20 March 1967 in Karlovo) is Bulgaria's most successful ever sprint canoeist. He competed mostly in the Canadian canoe C-1 event though he did win world championship medals in the C-4 events.

Competing in four Summer Olympics, he won three medals, including double gold at Barcelona in 1992. In addition, he won thirteen medals at the ICF Canoe Sprint World Championships with five golds (C-1 200 m: 1994, 1995; C-1 500 m: 1993, 1994, 1995), three silvers (C-1 500 m: 1991, C-1 1000 m: 1991, 1994), and five bronzes (C-1 500 m: 1986, C-4 500 m: 1990, C-4 1000 m: 1989, 1990, 1991).

The final gold medal of his career came at the 1997 European Championships, held on his home course in Plovdiv, where he won the C-1 500 m title.

Bukhalov was a member of the Trakia club in Plovdiv and was coached by Georgi Uchkunov. He is 187 cm (6'2") tall and raced at 83 kg (183 lbs).

References
DatabaseOlympics.com profile

1967 births
Bulgarian male canoeists
Canoeists at the 1988 Summer Olympics
Canoeists at the 1992 Summer Olympics
Canoeists at the 1996 Summer Olympics
Canoeists at the 2000 Summer Olympics
Living people
Olympic canoeists of Bulgaria
Olympic gold medalists for Bulgaria
Olympic bronze medalists for Bulgaria
Sportspeople from Plovdiv
People from Karlovo
Olympic medalists in canoeing
ICF Canoe Sprint World Championships medalists in Canadian

Medalists at the 1992 Summer Olympics
Medalists at the 1988 Summer Olympics